Maklinskaya is a rural locality (a village) in Tarnogskoye Rural Settlement, Tarnogsky District, Vologda Oblast, Russia. The population was 54 as of 2002. There are 3 streets.

Geography 
Maklinskaya is located 8 km northwest of Tarnogsky Gorodok (the district's administrative centre) by road. Verigino is the nearest rural locality.

References 

Rural localities in Tarnogsky District